Qi, known as the Northern Qi, Later Qi (後齊) or Gao Qi (高齊) in historiography, was a Chinese imperial dynasty and one of the Northern dynasties during the Northern and Southern dynasties era. It ruled the eastern part of northern China from 550 to 577. The dynasty was founded by Gao Yang (Emperor Wenxuan), and was eventually conquered by the Xianbei-led Northern Zhou dynasty in 577.

History

Northern Qi was the successor state of the Chinese Xianbei state of Eastern Wei and was founded by Emperor Wenxuan. Emperor Wenxuan had an Han father of largely Xianbei culture, Gao Huan, and a Xianbei mother, Lou Zhaojun. As Eastern Wei's powerful minister Gao Huan was succeeded by his sons Gao Cheng and Gao Yang, who took the throne from Emperor Xiaojing of Eastern Wei in 550 and established Northern Qi as Emperor Wenxuan.

Northern Qi was the strongest state out of the three main states (the other two being Northern Zhou state and Chen Dynasty) in China when Chen was established. Northern Qi however was plagued by violence and/or incompetent emperors (in particular Houzhu), corrupt officials, and deteriorating armies. In 571, an important official who guide the emperors Emperor Wucheng and Houzhu, He Shikai, was killed.  Houzhu attempted to strengthen the power of throne, instead he triggered a series of purges that became violent in late 573.

In 577, Northern Qi was assaulted by Northern Zhou, a northwestern kingdom with poorer resources.  The Northern Qi, with ineffective leadership, quickly disintegrated within a month, with large scale defections of court and military personnel. Both Houzhu and the last emperor Youzhu were captured, and both died in late 577.  Emperor Wenxuan's son Gao Shaoyi, the Prince of Fanyang, under protection by Tujue, later declared himself the emperor of Northern Qi in exile, but was turned over by Tujue to Northern Zhou in 580 and exiled to modern Sichuan. It is a matter of dispute whether Gao Shaoyi should properly be considered a Northern Qi emperor, but in any case the year 577 is generally considered by historians as the ending date for Northern Qi.

Arts

Northern Qi ceramics mark a revival of Chinese ceramic art, following the disastrous invasions and the social chaos of the 4th century. Northern Qi tombs have revealed some beautiful artifacts, such as porcelain with splashed green designs, previously thought to have been developed under the Tang dynasty.

Markedly unique from earlier depictions of the Buddha, Northern Qi statues tend to be smaller, around three feet tall, and columnar in shape.

A jar has been found in a Northern Qi tomb, which was closed in 576, and is considered as a precursor of the Tang Sancai style of ceramics.

Also, brown glazed wares designed with Sasanian-style figures have been found in these tombs. These works suggest a strong cosmopolitanism and intense exchanges with Western Asia, which are also visible in metalworks and relief sculptures across China during this period. Cosmopolitanism was therefore already current during the Northern Qi period in the 6th century, even before the advent of the notoriously cosmopolitan Tang dynasty, and was often associated with Buddhism.<ref>[https://books.google.com/books?id=Ch04UBWfplQC&pg=PA168 China between empires: the northern and southern dynasties by Mark Edward Lewis p.168]</ref>

Ethnocultural identity

The Northern Qi, although founded by a ruler of mixed Han/Xianbei origin, strongly asserted their Xianbei ethnic cultural identity. They regarded surviving ethnic Tuoba (themselves also Xianbei) and non-Han of the Northern Wei court and as well as literati of all ethnicities as near Han, referring to them as Han'er or Han kids (漢兒).  However they employed Han and sometimes Central Asian courtiers. While some Qi elite families had expressed strongly anti-Han sentiments due to unclear reasons, they may also lay claim to Han elite origin.  Emperor Wenxuan's father Gao Huan himself, who was reported as having said to his soldiers in the Xianbei language: "You guys are our proud military men and the lowly Han are just your working slaves", was descended from the Gao family of Bohai (渤海高氏) of ethnic Han descent in what is now modern Hebei. He had become Xianbeified as his family had lived for some time in Inner Mongolia after his grandfather was relocated from Bohai.

Religions

A Chinese scholar translated the Buddhist text Nirvana Sutra text into a Turkic language during this era. Some Zoroastrianism influences that went into previous states continued onto the state of Northern Qi court, such as the love for Persian dogs (sacred in  Zoroastrianism) as they were taken as pets by nobles and eunuchs. The Chinese utilized a number of Persian artifacts and products.

Northern Qi Great Wall

Faced with the threat of the Göktürks from the north, from 552 to 556 the Qi built up to 3,000 li (about 1,600 kilometres (990 mi)) of wall from Shanxi to the sea at Shanhai Pass. In 552, the Great Wall was built, starting at the northwest frontier, starting from Lishi (离石) and expanding towards west Shuoxian (朔县), with total length of over 400 kilometers. 

In 555, Emperor Wenxuan commanded to repair and rebuild the existing Great Wall of Northern Wei. Over the course of the year 555 alone, 1.8 million men were mobilized to build the Juyong Pass and extend its wall by 450 kilometres (280 mi) through Datong to the eastern banks of the Yellow River. In 557 a secondary wall was built inside the main one, starting from east of Pianguan (偏关), passing Yanmen Pass, Pingxing (平型) Pass, and continuing to Xiaguan (下关) in Shanxi Province. In 563, Emperor Wucheng built a section of frontier wall along the Taihang Mountains on the border of Shanxi and Hebei provinces. These walls were built quickly from local earth and stones or formed by natural barriers. Two stretches of the stone-and-earth Qi wall still stand in Shanxi today, measuring 3.3 metres (11 ft) wide at their bases and 3.5 metres (11 ft) high on average. In 577 the Northern Zhou conquered the Northern Qi and in 580 made repairs to the existing Qi walls. The route of the Qi and Zhou walls would be mostly followed by the later Ming wall west of Gubeikou.

 Emperors

 Emperors family tree 

 See also 

 Buddhism in China
 Tomb of Lou Rui (570 CE)

 Notes 

 References 
 Citations 

 Sources 

 Book of Northern Qi.
 History of Northern Dynasties.
 Zizhi Tongjian''.

External links 
 

 
Dynasties in Chinese history
Former countries in Chinese history
550 establishments
6th-century establishments in China
577 disestablishments
6th-century disestablishments in China